René Diehl (1912–1980) was a French archaeologist.

See also
Jublains archeological site -Diehl carried out one of the excavations 

1912 births
1980 deaths
École Centrale Paris alumni
French archaeologists
20th-century archaeologists